Igualda posticalis is a species of beetle in the family Cerambycidae, and the only species in the genus Igualda. It was described by Thomson in 1868.

References

Calliini
Beetles described in 1868
Monotypic beetle genera